The 1959 All-Ireland Minor Football Championship was the 28th staging of the All-Ireland Minor Football Championship, the Gaelic Athletic Association's premier inter-county Gaelic football tournament for boys under the age of 18.

Dublin entered the championship as defending champions.

On 27 September 1959, Dublin won the championship following an 0-11 to 1-4 defeat of Cavan in the All-Ireland final. This was their seventh All-Ireland title overall and their second in succession. It was also a fifth All-Ireland title in six championship seasons for Dublin.

Results

Connacht Minor Football Championship
Mayo 4-15 Sligo 1-5 Quarter Final
Mayo 3-9 Leitrim 4-4 Semi Final
Galway 2-5 Roscommon 1-4
Galway 3-9- Mayo 1-8 Final

Leinster Minor Football Championship

Munster Minor Football Championship

Ulster Minor Football Championship

All-Ireland Minor Football Championship
Semi-Finals

Cavan 2-3 Galway 0-8

Final

References

1959
All-Ireland Minor Football Championship